Rabin is a Hebrew surname. It originates from the Hebrew  word rav meaning Rabbi, or from the name of the specific Rabbi Abin. The most well known bearer of the name was Yitzhak Rabin,  prime minister of Israel and Nobel Peace prize Laureate.

People with surname Rabin
 Al Rabin (1936–2012), American soap opera producer
 Beatie Deutsch (née Rabin; born 1989), Haredi Jewish American-Israeli marathon runner
 Chaim Menachem Rabin, German-Israeli semitic-linguist
 Eve Queler (née Rabin), American conductor
 Leah Rabin, wife of Yitzhak Rabin
 Matthew Rabin, American professor and researcher in economics
 Michael Rabin (1936–1972), American violin virtuoso
 Michael O. Rabin, Israeli computer scientist and Turing Award recipient
 Nathan Rabin, American film and music critic
 John James Audubon (born Jean Rabin, 1785–1851), American ornithologist
 Oscar Rabin (1899–1958), Latvian-born British band leader and musician
 Oscar Rabin (1928–2018), Russian painter
 Ronald J. Rabin (b. 1932), North Carolina senator
 Samuel Rabin (1905–1993), New York judge
 Samuel Rabin (1903–1991), British sculptor, artist, singer and wrestler
 Trevor Rabin, rock guitarist, member of the English band Yes (1983–94), and film soundtrack composer
 Yitzhak Rabin (1922–1995), prime minister of Israel

See also
 Rabinow (surname)
 Rabinowitz (surname)
 Rabin automaton
 Rabin cryptosystem
Rabin–Karp string search algorithm
Rabin Square (Kikar Rabin)
Mechinat Rabin pre-army preparatory program
Miller–Rabin primality test
 Rąbiń, a village in Poland

Jewish surnames
Hebrew-language surnames
Occupational surnames